Alucra is a town and a district of Giresun Province in the Black Sea region of Turkey,  from the city of Giresun. It was a district of Şebinkarahisar province between 1924-1933.

Etymology
Alucra is a modification of the Ottoman Empire name El Ücra meaning far-off or remote.

Geography
Alucra is an inland district, high in the Giresun Mountains, in the upper reaches of the Kelkit River. The weather on the Black Sea coast is typically wet and humid but Alucra is high inland therefore much cooler in winter, when it snows, and then dry and hot in summer. The snow melts in March and April and the spring rains last until June, during these months the rivers are full. The countryside is high mountain and pasture, with fir tree cover on the north-facing mountainsides and bare southern faces. Cattle are grazed in the pastures and some wheat is grown despite the dry summers, and in general Alucra is a collection of remote villages. 

Local cuisine includes:
 Fit (Düü) Çorbası - a soup made of onions and bulgur wheat
 Yağlaç - a cornflour-based polenta-style meal
 Pancar Çorbası - beetroot soup
 Ekmek Aşı - dried bread soaked in a stew of fried meat with onions and hot pepper
 Ayran Çorbası - yoghurt soup
 Kesme Çorbası - a kind of local minestrone soup with lentils and dumplings
 Helle - a soupy dish of bulgur and mint
 Oğlak Kebabı - yeanling kebab
In July, there is a well-known summer festival.

History
This area has firstly been settled by the Hittites in ancient times. During the Middle Ages, Alucra was the part of the Byzantine Empire, disrupted by the Arab armies of the Abbasid caliphate. 

Turks first came to the area in their 11th century movement into Anatolia from their homeland in Central Asia following their defeat of the Byzantines at the Battle of Malazgirt. From 1054 this area was settled by the Kipchak Turks from southern Russia, who moved into the area along the Black Sea coast, under the loose authority of the Seljuk Turks.  The Seljuks assumed direct control by defeating the Mengujekids in 1228, but their rule came to an end with their defeat by the Mongol hordes at Kösedağ in 1243. 

The Anatolian beyliks remerged despite the growth of the Ottoman Empire until the area was brought into Ottoman in 1473 with the defeat of Uzun Hasan by Sultan Mehmet II at the battle of Otlukbeli.

Places of interest

As well as walks in the high pastures (yayla), there are a number of historical sites:
 Kamışlı Kilisesi - a church in the village of Çakrak, built by Greeks in the 1800s
 Çakrak Kilisesi - a ruined church
 Gelinkaya (Bride's Rock - site of a gruesome local legend)
 Ikizler Tepesi - two hills near the village of Pirilli

Notable natives
 Nurettin Canikli (born 1960), Turkish politician and former minister

References

External links
  Local governor's official website
 Photos of Alucra - 1
 Photos of Alucra - 2
 Photos of Alucra - 3
 photos alucra and koman koyu
 Photos of the village of Akçiçek
 Village of Aktepe
 Village of Doludere
 and Tohumlu Tohumluk

Populated places in Giresun Province
Districts of Giresun Province
Towns in Turkey